Victor Bârsan (born September 28, 1950) is a Romanian diplomat. He was the Romanian Ambassador to Moldova (1999–2001) and the editor in chief of Revista 22 (1991).

Works 
 Masacrul inocenților, 1993
 The Ilaşcu trial, 1994

See also
 Embassy of Romania in Chişinău
 Moldovan–Romanian relations

References

External links 
 Victor Bârsan
 Victor Bârsan

1950 births
Living people
Diplomats from Bucharest
Eastern Orthodox Christians from Romania
Journalists from Bucharest
Ambassadors of Romania to Moldova
University of Bucharest alumni